The Johnson County Courthouse in Tecumseh, Nebraska was built during 1888–89.  It was listed on the National Register of Historic Places in 1990.  The listing included the building and four contributing objects.

It is a two-story  by  red brick and limestone building that was designed by William Gray with Romanesque Revival architecture stylings.

References

Historic districts on the National Register of Historic Places in Nebraska
Romanesque Revival architecture in Nebraska
Neoclassical architecture in Nebraska
Government buildings completed in 1888
Johnson County, Nebraska